The bank effect (channel effect, bank suction, bank cushion, stern suction, ship-bank interaction) is the tendency of the stern of a ship to swing toward the near bank when operating in a river or constricted waterway.

Phenomenon 
The asymmetric flow around a ship induced by the vicinity of banks causes pressure differences (Bernoulli's principle) between port and starboard sides. As a result, a lateral force will act on the ship, mostly directed towards the closest bank, as well as a yawing moment pushing her bow towards the centre of the waterway. The squat effect increases due to the decreased blockage.

This phenomenon depends on many parameters, such as bank shape, water depth, ship-bank distance, ship properties, ship speed and propeller action. A reliable estimation of bank effects is important for determining the limiting conditions in which a ship can safely navigate a waterway.

Examples
It was cited as a possible cause of the 2021 Suez Canal obstruction by the cargo ship Ever Given.

See also

References

External links 
 Model tests demonstrating the bank effect for International Conference on Ship Manoeuvring in Shallow and Confined Water (MASHCON) at  Ghent University  January 2010 
 Bank Effects at Knowledge Centre, Manoeuvring in Shallow and Confined Water Ghent University
 MASHCON 1 : Bank Effects
 MASHCON 2 : Ship to Ship Interaction
 MASHCON 3 : Lock effects
 MASHCON 4 : Ship Bottom Interaction
 MASHCON 5 : waves, wind and current
 MASHCON 6 : Port Manoeuvres (May 2022)
Nautical terminology
Marine propulsion